"Rich" is a song recorded by American country music singer Maren Morris for her major-label debut album, Hero (2016). Morris co-wrote the song with Jessie Jo Dillon and Laura Veltz, and co-produced the track with busbee. It was released to American country radio on February 12, 2018, through Columbia Nashville as the album's fourth and final single.

Composition
"Rich" blends elements of country music with reggae and hip hop for a sound that "transcends classification." The song features "laid-back, breezy" vocals in the verses and a "singalong" chorus. Lyrically, the song details ways that a man has done Morris wrong, framed by hypothetical dollar values for these infractions that would result in Morris being rich. According to critics, Morris's delivery expresses "hip-hop bravado" and a "sly wit" as she toys with unconventional rhymes.

Release and promotion
On January 22, 2018, "Rich" was announced as the album's final single and was made available to radio through the Daily Play MPE service. According to Morris, the choice was influenced by positive fan reception to the song, noting that it was "the first time we've really let fans pick the single." The announcement came days after news of the release of her Zedd collaboration, "The Middle", which was promoted concurrently to pop formats and internationally. "Rich" officially impacted country radio on February 12, 2018.

Music video
The music video was directed by TK McKamy and Produced by Joel Hartz and premiered on CMT, GAC, CMT Music & VEVO in 2018.

Critical reception
In a review of Hero, Jon Caramanica of the New York Times wrote that the song was positioned as "CMT's bid for Song of the Summer" due to its strong hook and crossover potential. Chuck Dauphin of Billboard wrote that "Rich" blends humor with "more than just a little" truth, which he called "a sign of her deep intelligence as a composer." Brittney McKenna of Rolling Stone called "Rich" the highlight of Hero and wrote that it is "a genre-defying amalgam of what makes today's country music interesting: a little profanity, a lot of swagger and catchy hooks for days."

Accolades

Commercial performance
"Rich" debuted at number 50 on the Billboard Country Airplay chart dated February 24, 2018 and was the week's highest debut. On the week dated October 6, the song debuted at number 96 on the Billboard Hot 100 and peaked at number 62 the week dated December 1, remaining on the chart for eight weeks. The song has sold 159,000 copies in the United States as of December 2018.

Charts

Weekly charts

Year-end charts

Certifications

References

2016 songs
2018 singles
Maren Morris songs
Columbia Nashville Records singles
Song recordings produced by busbee
American hip hop songs
American reggae songs
Songs written by Laura Veltz
Songs written by Maren Morris
Songs written by Jessie Jo Dillon